The Melling Hellcat is a concept sports car designed by Al Melling to be the fastest street legal car in the world. It was introduced in February 2007 and was scheduled to come out in 2012. The car is powered by a 6.0 litre quad-turbo V10 Engine giving it , higher than that of the fastest street-legal car at the time, the Bugatti Veyron Super Sport.

The prototype of this car was produced in 2006.  As of July 2019, the car is still not in production, presumed cancelled.

Specifications
Engine: 6.0 litre v10
Induction: 4 turbos
Intake Cooling: 2 intercoolers
Power: 
Torque: 
Claimed Top Speed: 475 km/h

In the media
BBC television's Top Gear ran a short segment on the Hellcat, in their Season 9 Episode 4 show. Presenter James May commented that he doubted if the car's drag coefficient would be low enough ("slippery enough") to reach the claimed top speed. In addition, the prototype's weight is also prohibitive of it reaching the claimed top speed. 

The prototype was also digitised and featured as the centre-piece of the racing video game Juiced 2.

References

External links
 Supercar unveiled
 Paultan.org
 Hellcat concept video

Coupés
Cars of England
Upcoming car models